"Joy In My Heart," sometimes titled "I've Got the Joy, Joy, Joy, Joy" or "Joy, Joy Down in My Heart" is a popular Christian song often sung around the campfire and during scouting events.  It is often included in Gospel music and a cappella concerts, songbooks, and Christian children's songbooks.  The song was written by George William Cooke. Cooke was born in Doncaster, Yorkshire, England in 1884 and died in Jamestown, New York in 1951. He was the author of "Joy in My Heart" which was copyrighted in 1925 (but not renewed). At that time he was living in Wilmington, Delaware. He was a minister and associated with a group called Gospel Crusaders which was associated with the Methodist Church. He ran the Delmarva Camp, a Methodist camp that held gospel meetings and revivals. He was later minister of Methodist churches in Buffalo and Rochester New York. As a young man, he twice circled the globe in evangelistic tours with Commissioner Samuel L. Brengle of the Salvation Army.

In popular culture 

The song is the origin of the title of William Stafford's prose memoir of his WWII pacifist service, Down In My Heart.

NRBQ's version of the song, known as "Down in My Heart", appeared in the American television adaption of Wilfred when it was featured during the final moments of the series finale. Though the context it's played in is not conducive to the song’s original theme of Christianity, instead referring to the main character coming to peace with his state of mind, it is possibly for this reason that only the chorus of the song is played.
 
Granny (actress Irene Ryan) sings the song in an episode of the 1960s TV sitcom The Beverly Hillbillies 
 
In "Lisa's First Word", the tenth episode of the fourth season of The Simpsons, characters Rod and Todd Flanders sing this song.
 
The song was included by The Housemartins as one of the tracks on the London 0 Hull 4 Deluxe Edition album, from when lead singer Paul Heaton's lyrics reflected his Christian views at the time.
 
The song is sung by Jeremy Sumpter and Matt O'Leary at the beginning of the 2001 thriller Frailty.
 
In the 2014 game LISA, the song is repeatedly sung by the character Buzzo when offering the in-game drug, Joy.
 
In 2015, S7E7 of Tosh.0 featured Daniel Tosh referencing and singing it. It was also used in a Coca-Cola ad that April.
 
In 2016, Volkswagen used the song in a TV commercial aired during the UEFA Euro 2016.
 
In 2017, it is sung in the first episode of Sun Records.
 
In 2018, for King & Country sample the song for their single "Joy".

References

External links
 I've Got the Joy lyrics (with guitar chords)
 The song, as sung by "Noelle & John" is available for free download in MP3 format

Christian songs
Songs about Jesus
English children's songs
1925 songs
American children's songs